Mukti is a 1977 Indian Hindi-language drama film directed by Raj Tilak, starring Shashi Kapoor, Sanjeev Kumar, Vidya Sinha and Mithun Chakraborty

Plot 
Kailash Sharma is found guilty of sexually molesting Shanno and killing Dheeraj Kumar Verma, and is sentenced to be hanged by the Jammu & Kashmir Sessions Court. After his appeals at both High and Supreme Courts fail, he asks his wife, Seema, to take their daughter, Pinky, and re-locate elsewhere. Seema and Pinky re-locate to Bombay where she takes up sewing to make a living. She befriends their neighbour, Ratan, and both get married. 14 years later Pinky has grown up and has a boyfriend, Vikram, who she wants to marry. Meanwhile, Kailash, who is still alive, as his sentence was changed to life imprisonment, arrives in Bombay to look for his family. After sometime he does find them but decides not to interfere in their lives as they appear to be happy. But when Seema finds out she goes to meet him secretly – a visit that will set off a chain of events that will end up drastically changing their lives forever.

Cast 
Shashi Kapoor as  Kailash Sharma
Sanjeev Kumar as Ratan
Vidya Sinha as Seema K. Sharma
Bindiya Goswami as Pinky K. Sharma
Master Bittu as Young Pinky K. Sharma
Deven Verma as Tony
Kader Khan as Hussain
A. K. Hangal as Colonel
Anju Mahendru as Shanno
Dev Kumar as Jaggu
Sapru as Mr. Verma
Murad as Mr. Kapoor
Brahm Bhardwaj as Police Commissioner
Pinchoo Kapoor as Vikram's Father
Bhagwan as Gopal
S. N. Banerjee as Judge
Vikram as Vikram (Guest Appearance)
Mithun Chakraborty as Stage Artist (Guest Appearance)
Roopesh Kumar as Dheeraj Kumar Verma (Guest Appearance)
Prema Narayan as Mary (Guest Appearance)

Crew 
Director – Raj Tilak
Story – Dhruva Chatterjee
Screenplay – Dhruva Chatterjee, Keka Chatterjee, Renu Khanna
Dialogue – Kader Khan
Producer – Raj Tilak
Production Company – Tilak Movies Pvt. Ltd.
Cinematographer – K. K. Mahajan
Editor – Pran Mehra, R. P. Bapat
Art Director – Bansi Chandragupta
Costume Design – Keka Chatterjee, Jennifer Kendal, Shashi Magan
Choreographer – Suresh Bhatt
Music Director – Rahul Dev Burman
Lyricist – Anand Bakshi
Playback Singers – Mohammad Rafi, Asha Bhosle, Kishore Kumar, Lata Mangeshkar, Mukesh

Music 
Song "Suhaani Chaandni Raatein" was listed at #8 on Binaca Geetmala annual list 1977

References

External links 
 

1977 films
Films scored by R. D. Burman
1970s Hindi-language films
1977 drama films
Indian drama films
Hindi-language drama films